Arabhavi  is a village in the southern state of Karnataka, India. It is located in the Mudalagi taluk of Belagavi district. It is the location of a college of horticulture that is attached to University of Horticulture Sciences, Bagalkot.

Demographics
 India census, Arabhavi has a population of 9179 with 4515 males and 4664 females. It is situated nearby Gokak taluk.

See also
 Belgaum
 Districts of Karnataka

References

External links
 http://Belgaum.nic.in/

Villages in Belagavi district